This is a list of Danish television related events from 1973.

Events

Debuts

Television shows

Ending this year

Births
13 January - Liv Corfixen, actress
27 August - Anne Sofie Espersen, actress

Deaths

See also
1973 in Denmark